Expedition of Khalid ibn al-Walid, to Dumat Al-Jandal, to attack the Christian Prince of Duma, took place in March 631 AD, 9AH, 11th month of the Islamic Calendar, or October 630 AD according to William Montgomery Watt.

Expedition

Attack on Duma Castle
According to Ar-Rahīq al-Makhtum (The Sealed Nectar), a modern Islamic hagiography of Muhammad written by the Indian Muslim author Saif ur-Rahman Mubarakpuri, Muhammad sent Khalid ibn Walid to Dumatul Jandal, against Ukaydir ibn Abd al-Malik al-Kindi, the Christian prince of Dumatul Jandal (the area is also known as Duma).

Khalid ibn Walid was sent with 450 horsemen (or 420 according to other sources) and Muhammad said to Khalid: "You will see him hunting oryxes".

When Khalid came to the castle of the Christian prince, he saw oryxes coming out rubbing their horns against the castle gate, and he saw Ukaydir hunting the oryxes.

Ukaydir's brother was also out hunting, and after a short struggle, Khalid ibn Walid captured and killed him. Then he took Ukaydir captive, but he was quickly surrounded by his followers.

Hostage and ransom
After Khalid took Ukaydir captive, he threatened to kill him if the gates of Duma were not opened.

Khalid brought him back to Muhammad, who spared his life for a ransom of 2000 camels, 800 slaves, 400 armours and 400 lances. He brought all this booty back to Madinah, along with the captive, he also brought another brother of the Prince of Duma. Mubarakpuri, mentions that another condition for sparing his life and making peace with him, was that he recognize the duty of paying the tribute (Jizyah) and must collect the Jizyah from Dumat, Tabuk, Ailah and Taima’.

Classical Islamic sources

The event is also mentioned by the Muslim Scholar Ibn Sa'd in his book "Kitab al-tabaqat al-kabir", as follows:

The event is also mentioned in the Sunni hadith collection Sunan Abu Dawud, it is written:

See also
Military career of Muhammad
List of expeditions of Muhammad

References

Dumatul Jandal
630s conflicts
Campaigns ordered by Muhammad
631